The team dressage in equestrian at the 2018 Asian Games was held at the Jakarta International Equestrian Park on 20 August 2018.

Schedule
All times are Western Indonesia Time (UTC+07:00)

Results
Legend
EL — Eliminated

References

External links
Equestrian at the 2018 Asian Games

Team dressage